The articles in English are the definite article the and the indefinite articles a and an. They are the two most common determiners. The definite article is the default determiner when the speaker believes that the listener knows the identity of a common noun's referent (because it is obvious, because it is common knowledge, or because it was mentioned in the same sentence or an earlier sentence). The indefinite article is the default determiner for other singular, countable, common nouns, while no determiner is the default for other common nouns. Other determiners are used to add semantic information such as amount (many, a few), proximity (this, those), or possession (my, the government's).

Usage 
English grammar requires that, in most cases, a singular, countable noun phrase start with a determiner. For example, I have a box is OK, but *I have box is not. The most common determiners are the articles the and a(n), which specify the presence or absence of definiteness of the noun. Other possible determiners include words like this, my, each and many. There are also cases where no determiner is required, as in the sentence John likes fast cars, where neither John nor fast cars includes a determiner.

The definite article the is the default when the referent of the noun phrase headed by a common noun is assumed to be unique or known from the context. For example, In the sentence The boy with glasses was looking at the moon, it is assumed that in the context the reference can only be to one boy and one moon. However, the definite article is not typically used:
with generic nouns (plural or uncountable): cars have accelerators, happiness is contagious, referring to cars in general and happiness in general (compare the happiness I felt yesterday, specifying particular happiness);
with proper names: John, France, London, etc.

The indefinite article a (before a consonant sound) or an (before a vowel sound) is used only with singular, countable nouns. It indicates that the referent of the noun phrase is one unspecified member of a class. For example, the sentence An ugly man was smoking a pipe does not specify the identity of the ugly man or pipe.

When referring to a particular date, the definite article the is typically used.
He was born on the 10th of May.
When referring to a day of the week, the indefinite article "a" or definite article "the" may be used, following the same guidelines of generality versus specificity.
He was born on a Thursday.
He was born on the Monday before Thanksgiving.

No article is used with plural or uncountable nouns when the referent is indefinite (just as in the generic definite case described above). However, in such situations, the determiner some is often added (or any in negative contexts and in many questions). For example:
There are apples in the kitchen or There are some apples in the kitchen;
We do not have information or We do not have any information;
Would you like tea? or Would you like some tea? and Would you like any tea? or Would you like some good tea?

Additionally, articles are not normally used:
 in noun phrases that contain other determiners (my house, this cat, America's history), although one can combine articles with certain other determiners, as in the many issues, such a child (see ).
 with pronouns (he, nobody), although again certain combinations are possible (as the one, the many, the few).
 preceding noun phrases consisting of a clause or infinitive phrase (what you've done is very good, to surrender is to die).

If it is required to be concise, e.g. in headlines, signs, labels, and notes, articles are often omitted along with certain other function words. For example, rather than The mayor was attacked, a newspaper headline might say just Mayor attacked.

For more cases where no article is used, see Zero article in English.

Word order 
In most cases, the article is the first word of its noun phrase, preceding all other adjectives and modifiers.
[The little old red bag] held [a very big surprise].

There are a few exceptions, however:
Certain determiners, such as all, both, half, double, precede the definite article when used in combination (all the team, both the girls, half the time, double the amount).
The determiner such and exclamative what precede the indefinite article (such an idiot, what a day!).
Adjectives qualified by too, so, as and how generally precede the indefinite article: too great a loss, so hard a problem, as delicious an apple as I have ever tasted, I know how pretty a girl she is.
When adjectives are qualified by quite (particularly when it means "fairly"), the word quite (but not the adjective itself) often precedes the indefinite article: quite a long letter.

See also  and Determiners and adjectives.

Definite article 

The only definite article in English is the word the, denoting person(s) or thing(s) already mentioned, under discussion, implied, or otherwise presumed familiar to the listener or reader. The is the most commonly used word in the English language, accounting for 7% of all words used.

"The" can be used with both singular and plural nouns, with nouns of any gender, and with nouns that start with any letter. This is different from many other languages which have different articles for different genders and/or numbers.

Abbreviations for "the" and "that" 

Since "the" is one of the most frequently used words in English, at various times short abbreviations for it have been found:

Barred thorn: the earliest abbreviation, it is used in manuscripts in the Old English language. It is the letter þ, with a bold horizontal stroke through the ascender, and it represents the word þæt, meaning "the" or "that" (neuter nom. / acc.)
þͤ and þͭ (þ with a superscript e or t) appear in Middle English manuscripts for "þe" and "þat" respectively.
yͤ and yͭ are developed from þͤ and þͭ and appear in Early Modern manuscripts and in print (see Ye form below).

Occasional proposals have been made by individuals for an abbreviation. In 1916, Legros & Grant included in their classic printers' handbook Typographical Printing-Surfaces, a proposal for a letter similar to Ħ to represent "Th", thus abbreviating "the" to ħe. Why they did not propose reintroducing to the English language "þ", for which blocks were already available for use in Icelandic texts, or the yͤ form is unknown.

Ye form 
 
In Middle English, the (þe) was frequently abbreviated as a þ with a small e above it, similar to the abbreviation for that, which was a þ with a small t above it. During the latter Middle English and Early Modern English periods, the letter thorn (þ) in its common script, or cursive, form came to resemble a y shape. One major reason for this was that  existed in the printer's types that William Caxton and his contemporaries  imported from Belgium and the Netherlands, while  did not. As a result, the use of a y with an e above it as an abbreviation became common. It can still be seen in reprints of the 1611 edition of the King James Version of the Bible in places such as Romans 15:29 or in the Mayflower Compact. Historically, the article was never pronounced with a y sound even when it was so written.

Indefinite article 

The indefinite article of English takes the two forms: a and an. Semantically, they can be regarded as meaning "one", usually without emphasis. They can be used only with singular countable nouns; for the possible use of some (or any) as an equivalent with plural and uncountable nouns, see Use of some below.

Etymology 
An is the older form (related to one, which it also predates, cognate to Dutch een, German ein, Gothic 𐌰𐌹𐌽𐍃, Old Norse einn, etc.). The Old English word ān was derived from Proto-West Germanic *ain, which was derived from Proto-Germanic *ainaz. All of these words descended from Proto-Indo-European *óynos, meaning "single".

Distinction between a and an 
The [n] of the original Old English indefinite article ān got gradually assimilated before consonants in almost all dialects by the 15th century. Before vowels, the [n] survived into Modern English.

Currently, the form an is used before words starting with a vowel sound, regardless of whether the word begins with a vowel letter. Where the next word begins with a consonant sound, a is used. Examples: a box; an apple; an SSO (pronounced "es-es-oh"); an MP3 (pronounced "em-pee-three"); a HEPA filter (here, HEPA is an acronym, a series of letters pronounced as a word rather than as individual letters); an hour (the h is silent); a one-armed bandit (pronounced "won..."); an $80 fee (read "an eighty-dollar fee"); an herb in American English (where the h is silent), but a herb in British English; a unionized worker but an un-ionized particle.

In older loan words of Latin or Greek provenance, initial h used to be silent in general, thus the use of an before such words was common and has survived to some extent to recent times even when the h has been restored in pronunciation. Some speakers and writers use an before a word beginning with the sound  in an unstressed syllable: an historical novel, an hotel. However, this usage is now less common.

Some dialects, particularly in England (such as Cockney), silence many or all initial h sounds (h-dropping), and so employ an in situations where it would not be used in the standard language, like an 'elmet (standard English: a helmet).

There used to be a distinction analogous to that between a and an for the possessive determiners my and thy, which became mine and thine before a vowel, as in mine eyes.

In other languages 

Other more or less analogous cases in different languages include the Yiddish articles "a" and "an" (used in essentially the same manner as the English ones), the Hungarian articles a and az (used the same way, except that they are definite articles; juncture loss, as described below, has occurred in that language too), and the privative a- and an- prefixes, meaning "not" or "without", in Greek and Sanskrit.

Pronunciation 
Both a and an are usually pronounced with a schwa: , . See Weak and strong forms in English.

Juncture loss 
In a process called juncture loss, the n has wandered back and forth between the indefinite article and words beginning with vowels over the history of the language, where for example what was once a nuncle is now an uncle. One example is the text "smot hym on the hede with a nege tool" from 1448 in the Paston Letters, meaning "smote him on the head with an edge tool". Other examples include a nox for an ox and a napple for an apple. Sometimes the change has been permanent. For example, a newt was once an ewt, a nickname was once an ekename, where eke means "extra" (as in eke out meaning "add to"), and in the other direction, a napron (meaning a little tablecloth, related to the word napkin) became an apron, and a nadder became an adder. The initial n in orange was also dropped through juncture loss, but this happened before the word was borrowed into English.

Use of some 

The existential determinative (or determiner) some is sometimes used as a functional equivalent of a(n) with plural and uncountable nouns (also called a partitive). For example, Give me some apples, Give me some water (equivalent to the singular countable forms an apple and a glass of water). Grammatically this some is not required; it is also possible to use zero article: Give me apples, Give me water. The use of some in such cases implies some limited quantity. (Compare the forms unos/unas in Spanish, which are the plural of the indefinite article un/una.)
Like the articles, some belongs to the class of "central determiners", which are mutually exclusive (so "the some boys" is ungrammatical).

The contrasting use of any in negative clauses proves that some is polarity-sensitive, and occurs in positive clauses: "I have some objections to make", vs. "I don't have any objections to make"; "I have any objections to make" and "I don't have some objections to make" are ungrammatical.

Some can also have a more emphatic meaning: "some but not others" or "some but not many". For example, some people like football, while others prefer rugby, or I've got some money, but not enough to lend you any. It can also be used as an indefinite pronoun, not qualifying a noun at all (Give me some!) or followed by a prepositional phrase (I want some of your vodka); the same applies to any.

Some can also be used with singular countable nouns, as in There is some person on the porch, which implies that the identity of the person is unknown to the speaker (which is not necessarily the case when a(n) is used). This usage is fairly informal, although singular countable some can also be found in formal contexts: We seek some value of x such that...

In other meanings, it is pronounced .

Effect on alphabetical order 
In sorting titles and phrases alphabetically, articles are usually excluded from consideration, since being so common makes them more of a hindrance than a help in finding the desired item. For example, The Comedy of Errors is alphabetized before A Midsummer Night's Dream, because the and a are ignored and comedy alphabetizes before midsummer. In an index, the former work might be written "Comedy of Errors, The", with the article moved to the end.

In West Country English 
Speakers of West Country English may use articles in certain environments where speakers of Standard English would not. Non-standard uses occur for example with diseases (the chicken pox, the arthritis), quantifying expressions (the both, the most), holidays (the Christmas), geographical units and institutions (the church, the county Devon), etc. The indefinite article, on the other hand, often occurs as a also before vowels.

See also 
 False title

References

External links 

 Vietnamese learners mastering english articles
"The Definite Article: Acknowledging 'The' in Index Entries", Glenda Browne, The Indexer, vol. 22, no. 3 April 2001, pp. 119–22.
Low MH 2005: "The Phenomenon of the Word THE in English — discourse functions and distribution patterns" — a dissertation that surveys the use of the word 'the' in English text.
 When Do You Use Articles: A, An, The
 articles web training tool 
 Etymology of the word the on the Online Etymology Dictionary
 Mastering A, An, The: English Articles Solved
Articles